Bartolomé may refer to:

Places
 Bartolomé Island (Spanish: Isla Bartolomé), a volcanic islet in the Galápagos Islands Group
 Isla Bartolomé, Diego Ramirez Islands, Chile

People
 Bartolomé Bermejo (c.1440–c.1501), Spanish painter
 Bartolomé Esteban Murillo (1618–1682), Spanish painter 
 Bartolomé de Escobedo (1500–1563), Spanish composer 
 Bartolomé de las Casas (1484–1566), Spanish priest
 Bartolomé de Medina (mining specialist), (149?–15??), Spanish metallurgist
 Bartolomé de Medina (theologian), (1527–1581), Spanish theologian

See also
 Bartholomew (disambiguation)

Spanish masculine given names